HMIS Clive (L79) was a sloop, commissioned in 1920 into the Royal Indian Marine (RIM).

She served during World War II in the Royal Indian Navy (RIN), the successor to the RIM. Her pennant number was changed to U79 in 1940. Although originally built as a minesweeper, she was primarily used as a convoy escort during the war. She was scrapped soon after the end of the war.

History
HMIS Clive was ordered under the Emergency War Programme of World War I, she was completed after the end of the war. During World War II, she was a part of the Eastern Fleet. She escorted numerous convoys in the Indian Ocean 1942-45.

She was decommissioned and scrapped in 1947, soon after the end of the war.

Notes

References

Parkes, Oscar. Jane's Fighting Ships 1931. Newton Abbot, Devon, UK:Davis & Charles Reprints, 1931 (1973 reprint). .

Sloops of the Royal Indian Navy
1919 ships